Bitoraj is a mountain in Gorski Kotar, Croatia. It is variously defined as a standalone mountain (named Bitoraj or Burni Bitoraj) or as group of peaks of Velika Kapela. The highest peaks on it are Burni Bitoraj at 1,386 m.a.s.l., Velika Javornica at 1374 m.a.s.l., and the eponymous Bitoraj peak at 1,140 m.a.s.l.

References

Sources
 
 
 

Mountains of Croatia
Landforms of Primorje-Gorski Kotar County